...instore was a chain of retail stores in the United Kingdom, selling a range of products and principally concentrating on value homeware items.

The company had over 5,000 employees.

Instore plc's corporate history

Instore plc, formerly Brown & Jackson plc, was the parent company of "...instore", operating 340 stores across the United Kingdom, also including Poundstretcher and Ponden Mill branded sites.

The ...instore name was created as part of a major rebranding of the existing, value led Poundstretcher business that had been trading since 1981. In September 2002, the company concluded a programme of rebranding half its Poundstretcher stores as "...instore" in an attempt to reposition the business as a more mid market retailer.

Trading subsidiaries What Everyone Wants, Your More Stores and the Famous Brunswick Shoe Warehouse were also disposed of at this time. In 2004 Brown & Jackson sold its Polish retail business, which operated since 1999, to South African Pepkor. In July 2005 the company adopted the name of Instore plc, replacing the previous Brown & Jackson plc name.

In 2006, a new chief executive concluded that the re branding was not working and from 2007, new stores were opened as Poundstretcher stores. In January 2008, the company acquired 33 Ponden Mill stores under license from the administrators of the company, along with some rights to the Coloroll brand.

The company continued to operate both ...instore and Poundstretcher brands, but as of 2009, has reverted its core estate to the Poundstretcher brand.

Poundstretcher
Established in 1981 by Paul Appell and Stephen Fearnley, Poundstretcher had grown to a business consisting of 338 stores by 2004. Roughly half of the stores were converted to the ...instore format by the end of 2002, and the Poundstretcher business began to marketed jointly with ...instore outlets, sharing the same offers and slogan. By 2009, the company had deemed the rebranding exercise a failure, and ...instore shops were expected to revert to the Poundstretcher fascia.

A new Poundstretcher Extra format was developed for larger stores.

After selling Poundstretcher, Mr. Appell and Mr. Fearnley became involved in a failing retail business, United News Shops, which they managed to revitalise. Growing to become the largest convenience store and cafeteria business servicing British hospitals, United News Shops was sold to WH Smith in March 2008.

Profit warnings
During December 2006, the company issued a warning that its profits for the year would be likely to be well below expectations. This was blamed on difficulties experienced at the Huddersfield distribution centre following the introduction of a new software system and poor trading conditions. The company later reported that it was making progress in overcoming the problems it had experienced, and that sales growth for the six week period ending 13 January 2007 was 4.6%.

In May 2007, Peter Burdon, former chief executive of Thorntons, was installed as chief executive. In July 2008, the company rejected a £11.4 million cash offer for the business, arguing that the chain is being undervalued. The bid was made by Seaham Investments, who already control 30.6% of the company. In January 2009, a trading notice issued following the Christmas trading period was of a disappointment to the company, in which they said sales were not as expected.

Later in the month, the final year periods profits were announced at a £4 to 5 million pound loss.

References

External links
...instore, now Poundstretcher website 

Defunct retail companies of the United Kingdom
Retail companies established in 2003
Retail companies disestablished in 2009
Companies based in Huddersfield
Companies based in Kirklees
Companies based in Glasgow
2003 establishments in the United Kingdom
2009 disestablishments in the United Kingdom
Discount shops of the United Kingdom
Companies established in 2003